Olano or Olaño may refer to:

People
 Abraham Olano (born 1970), Spanish cyclist
 Antonio Ros de Olano, 1st Marquess of Guad-el-Jelú (1808–1886), Venezuelan-born Spanish writer, politician and military officer
 Arrel Olaño (born 1943), Filipino politician 
 Francisco José Urrutia Olano (1870–1950), Colombian diplomat and international jurist
 Markel Olano (born 1965), Basque politician
 Mikel Alonso Olano (born 1980), Spanish footballer 
 Patricia Olano (born 1950), Colombian swimmer
 Pedro Ignacio Wolcan Olano (born 1953), Uruguayan bishop
 Xabier Alonso Olano (born 1981), Spanish footballer 
 Mutya Orquia (born Ruelleen Angel Orquia Olano; 2006), Filipino actress

Other
 Germán Olano Airport, an airport in Puerto Carreño, Vichada Department, Colombia
 OĽaNO, a Slovakian political party
 United States v. Olano, a U.S. Supreme Court decision